Sibnica is a village in the municipality of Blace, Serbia. According to the 2011 census, the village has a population of 321 people, down from 470 in 2002.

References

Populated places in Toplica District